HD 109749 is a binary star about 206 light years away in the constellation of Centaurus.

Stellar system
The primary star, HD 109749 A, is a G-type subgiant with a spectral type of G3IV, indicating it is an evolved star with a luminosity higher than that of a main sequence star. HD 109749 A is chromospherically inactive and has a high metallicity, with an iron abundance 178% of Sun's.

The secondary star, HD 109749 B, is a K-type main sequence star with an apparent magnitude of 10.3. This star has the same proper motion as the primary and seems to be at the same distance, confirming they form a physical binary system.

Planetary system
In 2005, an exoplanet was discovered around HD 109749 A. It was detected by the radial velocity method as part of the N2K Consortium.

See also
 HD 149143
 List of extrasolar planets

References

G-type subgiants
Binary stars
K-type main-sequence stars
109749
61595
Centaurus (constellation)
Planetary systems with one confirmed planet
Durchmusterung objects
J12371639-4048435